Denmark started vaccinating against COVID-19 on 27 December 2020. Vaccination in Denmark is free of cost and voluntary. It is available to all residents of Denmark and those from abroad staying for more than 30 days in Denmark. Denmark has one of the highest levels of COVID-19 vaccination in the European Union as of the end of September 2021. In April 2022, Denmark announced the suspension of its COVID-19 vaccination program, making it the first country in the world to do so.
As of October 2022 the Danish Health Authorities recommend a booster vaccination to people aged 50 and over, as well as selected risk groups. They do so due to the expectation of an increasing number of COVID-19 infections during the autumn and winter months.

Vaccines on order 
There are several COVID-19 vaccines at various stages of development around the world.

Vaccine calendar 2021
The priority order for vaccination and scheduled time period for administering vaccine for each priority group is determined using a Vaccine Calendar in Denmark. The 10 target groups in descending order of priority are as follows:
 Residents in nursing homes.
 People over 65 years who receive both personal care and practical assistance. 
 People aged over 85 years. 
 Healthcare professionals, elderly care professionals and others who are identified to be at risk for infection or are performing a critical function in the society. 
 Persons with pre-existing conditions who have significantly higher risk for severe illness from COVID-19.
 Relatives of individuals or caregivers who are at increased risk of severe illness from COVID-19.
 Age group of 80–84. 
 Age group of 75–79.
 Age group of 65–74.
 Other age groups.
As of June 2021, children younger than 12 years and pregnant women are not offered vaccination in Denmark. As of September 2022, a booster shot is no longer recommended for people under the age of 50 in that country.

Children
Children and adolescents rarely become severely ill from the Omicron variant of COVID-19.  From 1 July 2022, it was no longer possible for children and adolescents aged under 18 to get the first injection and, from 1 September 2022, it was no longer possible for them to get the second injection. A very limited number of children at particularly higher risk of becoming severely ill will still be offered vaccination based on an individual assessment by a doctor.

Available vaccines
Denmark uses Pfizer/BioNTech and Moderna vaccines. Denmark was the first country in Europe to stop using Oxford-AstraZeneca as well as Janssen J&J vaccines by citing blood clots as side effects, despite the approval of these vaccines by the European Medicines Agency. As of May 2021, it became possible for Danish citizens to opt-in to receive any of these vaccines, although these vaccines were not included in the Danish vaccination program.

References

COVID-19 pandemic in Denmark
Denmark